Las Cruces Airport  is an airport serving the town of Sabana de Torres in the Santander Department of Colombia.

The runway is on the southern edge of the town.

See also

Transport in Colombia
List of airports in Colombia

References

External links
OpenStreetMap - Sabana de Torres
OurAirports - Sabana de Torres
Las Cruces Airport

Airports in Colombia